Parque Kukulcán Alamo (Kukulcán Alamo Park) is a  stadium located in the city of Mérida, Yucatán, Mexico.  It is primarily used for baseball, and is the home field of the Leones de Yucatán (Yucatán Lions) Mexican League baseball team.  It holds 14,917 people and was opened in 1982. The stadium is named for Kukulkán, the Maya feathered serpent deity.

See also
 Estadio Carlos Iturralde - a football stadium in Mérida

References

1982 establishments in Mexico
Estadio de Beisbol Kukulkan
Mexican League ballparks
Sports venues completed in 1982
Sports venues in Yucatán